Sir John Gresham (1495 – 23 October 1556) was an English merchant, courtier and financier who worked for King Henry VIII of England, Cardinal Wolsey and Thomas Cromwell. He was Lord Mayor of London and founded Gresham's School. He was the brother of Sir Richard Gresham.

Life
Gresham was probably born in 1495, at Holt in Norfolk, and was descended from an old Norfolk family. Biographers have suggested that he probably attended a school kept by Augustinian canons at nearby Beeston Priory. At that time, England was largely dependent on the church for education.

In about 1510, Gresham was apprenticed to John Middleton, a London mercer, and after serving his seven years he was admitted as a member of the Worshipful Company of Mercers. In 1519, he and his older brother William Gresham were both elected to the livery of the company. Later, John Gresham was four times Master of the Mercers' Company.

Gresham was, in partnership with his brother, Richard Gresham, in the export of textiles and in importing grain from Germany and wine from Bordeaux. He also traded in silks and spices from the Ottoman Empire and imported timber and skins from the Baltic. He was a founding member of the Muscovy Company, formed to trade with what is now Russia. Meanwhile, he acted as an agent for Cardinal Wolsey, and through him knew Thomas Cromwell.

Gresham invested his money in land, buying the manors of Titsey, Tatsfield, Westerham, and Lingfield, on the borders of Surrey and Kent, as well as estates in Norfolk and Buckinghamshire. He lived at a great house called Titsey Place at Oxted in Surrey from 1534 until his death.

Gresham was Sheriff of London and Middlesex in 1537–1538 and at the same time was knighted. He was a member of the Royal household between 1527 and 1550, first as a gentleman pensioner and later as one of the esquires of the body of King Henry VIII. In 1539, the king granted Gresham the manor of Sanderstead in Surrey, following the dissolution of the monasteries: it had previously belonged to the Minster of Winchester since the year 962.

In 1541, Gresham was one of the jurors who tried Thomas Culpepper and Francis Dereham for treason - that is, intimacy with Queen Catherine Howard. Both were duly beheaded at Tyburn on 10 December 1541, and their heads were put on display on London Bridge. Queen Catherine was subsequently executed on 13 February 1542. In 1546, Gresham was one of the King's commissioners to survey the properties of the chantries to be dissolved in Surrey and Sussex.

In 1547, Sir John Gresham became Lord Mayor of London, and after the end of his year in office he continued to serve as an alderman.

In 1555, a year before his death, he founded Gresham's School (then described as "the Free Grammar School of Sir John Gresham, knight, citizen and alderman of London") in the town of his birth, Holt, Norfolk. Gresham endowed the school with land and money and placed these endowments in the care of the Worshipful Company of Fishmongers, which has continued to carry out his trust to the present day.

Gresham died on 23 October 1556 of a "profuse fever", and his funeral was described as "very grand and very papistical". His tomb was in the City of London church of St Michael Bassishaw (demolished 1900).

The Gresham family
The Gresham family had been settled in the Norfolk village of Gresham since at least the 14th century, and an early Victorian writer concluded that it seemed very likely that the manor of Gresham Castle was the ancestral home of the family.

A John Gresham was baptized in 1340 at Aylmerton, Norfolk, and died there in 1410, owning property in Aylmerton and an interest in the manor of Holt. His son John Gresham was born in 1390 and died in 1450. In 1414, he was living at Holt. His son, James Gresham, of Holt, Norfolk, was Lord of the Manor of East Beckham, where he lived from 1442 to 1497, In the mid-fifteenth century he also built a manor house in the centre of the small town of Holt. His son John Gresham of Holt married Alice Blyth and was the father of the John Gresham born about 1495. A branch of the family was thus established at Holt  by the fifteenth century.

Gresham had two brothers, William Gresham, and Sir Richard Gresham, Lord Mayor of London in 1537 and father of Sir Thomas Gresham, founder of the Royal Exchange and Gresham College, both in the City of London.

Marriages and issue
Gresham married firstly, in 1521, Mary Ipswell, with whom he had twelve children between 1522 and 1538:

William Gresham (1522–1579), who was the father of Sir Thomas Gresham (d.1630) of Titsey Place, whose sons were Sir John Gresham of Titsey (1588–1643) and Sir Edward Gresham of Titsey (1594–1647). The latter's son, Sir Marmaduke Gresham of Limpsfield (1627–1696), was created a baronet in 1660.
John Gresham (born 13 March 1529), second son, who married on 17 July 1553, Elizabeth Dormer, daughter and heir of Edward Dormer, haberdasher, of London and Fulham and his wife, Katherine Sampson (see below). John Gresham and Elizabeth Dormer had three sons. After John Gresham's death his widow, Elizabeth, married William Plumbe (d.1593) of Northend near Fulham.
Mary Gresham.
Catherine Gresham.
James Gresham.
Edmund Gresham.
Anthony Gresham.
Ellen Gresham.
Ursula Gresham (1534-1574), who married Thomas Leveson (1532-1576), son of the London mercer Nicholas Leveson (d.1539) and Denise or Dionyse Bodley (d.1561), the daughter of Thomas Bodley (d.1493) and Joan Leche (d. March 1530), by whom she was the mother of William Leveson (d.1621), one of two trustees used by Cuthbert Burbage, Richard Burbage, William Kempe, Thomas Pope (d.1603), Augustine Phillips (d.1605), John Heminges (bap. 1566, d. 1630) and William Shakespeare (1564-1616) to allocate shareholdings in the Globe Theatre in 1599.
Cecily Gresham.
Elizabeth Gresham.
Richard Gresham.

Gresham married secondly, on 15 July 1553, Katherine Sampson (d.1578), widow of Edward Dormer (d.1539), brother of Sir Michael Dormer, Lord Mayor of London in 1541.

Descendants of Sir John Gresham
Most of Gresham's twelve children died without issue, but the senior line of Gresham's descendants continued until the early nineteenth century.

The 17th century Greshams sat as Members of Parliament, loyally supported King Charles I throughout the Civil War, and suffered from the victory of Cromwell. In 1643 the house at Titsey was commandeered by the Parliamentarians, but at the time of the Restoration in 1660 the new King Charles II created the head of the family, Marmaduke Gresham, a baronet as a reward for the family's support for the Royalist cause. This title died out with Sir John Gresham, sixth and last Baronet, of Limpsfield (who died in 1801). However, the last Sir John Gresham's daughter and heiress, Katherine Maria Gresham, married William Leveson-Gower, first cousin of the Marquess of Stafford, later the first Duke of Sutherland, and through Katherine Maria the Titsey estate continued to be owned by Sir John Gresham's descendants until the death of Thomas Leveson Gower in 1992. By his will, Leveson Gower set up the Titsey Foundation, a charitable trust with the aim of preserving the estate for the benefit of the nation. 
 
Nevertheless, the first Sir John Gresham's line continues in the descendants of his third son, another John Gresham, who was the ancestor of the Greshams of Fulham, Albury, and Haslemere.

Gresham's School

In 1555, shortly before his death, Gresham founded Gresham's School in his home town of Holt, Norfolk, placing its endowments under the stewardship of the Worshipful Company of Fishmongers, which has continued to carry out the task entrusted to it until the present day.

The Gresham Grasshopper

The grasshopper is the crest above Sir John Gresham's coat of arms. It can be seen at Titsey Place, his country house, and is used by Gresham's School, which he founded. It can also be seen as the weathervane on the Royal Exchange in the City of London, founded in 1565 by Gresham's nephew Sir Thomas Gresham. Gresham's original Royal Exchange building (destroyed in the Great Fire of London of 1666) was profusely decorated with grasshoppers. The grasshopper is also used as a symbol by Gresham College in the City of London, which Sir Thomas also established.

According to an ancient legend of the Greshams, the founder of the family, Roger de Gresham, was a foundling abandoned as a new-born baby in long grass in North Norfolk in the 13th century and found there by a woman whose attention was drawn to the child by a grasshopper. A beautiful story, it is more likely that the grasshopper is simply an heraldic rebus on the name Gresham, with gres being a Middle English form of grass (Old English grœs).

In the system of English heraldry, the grasshopper is said to represent wisdom and nobility.

The Gresham family motto is Fiat voluntas tua ('Thy will be done').

Notes

References

 Life and Times of Sir Thomas Gresham by J.W. Burgon (London, 1839)

External links
Will of Nicholas Leveson, proved 18 October 1539, National Archives Retrieved 6 April 2013
Will of Nicholas Leveson, The Sutherland Collection, Staffordshire Archives Retrieved 6 April 2013
Will of Dionyse Leveson, proved 20 December 1560, National Archives Retrieved 6 April 2013
Will of Thomas Leveson of Halling, Kent, proved 20 October 1576, National Archives Retrieved 6 April 2013
Leveson, Sir John (1556–1615), History of Parliament Retrieved 6 April 2013
Will of Edward Dormer, Haberdasher of London, proved 12 January 1540, PROB 11/28/4, National Archives Retrieved 8 May 2013 
 Felbridge History Group
 The Titsey Estate
 Gresham's School online

1495 births
1556 deaths
Sheriffs of the City of London
16th-century lord mayors of London
English merchants
Founders of English schools and colleges
English philanthropists
People from Holt, Norfolk
16th-century merchants
16th-century English businesspeople